Bjoa is a village in Vindafjord municipality in Rogaland county, Norway. The village is located along the coast of the Bjoafjorden, just across the fjord from the island of Borgundøya. The village has a kindergarten and an elementary school, serving the northern portion of Vindafjord municipality.[2]

Bjoa is the site of a large blueberry farm as well as several companies such as Tveit Maskin AS and T.Sandsgård Anlegg AS. The headquarters of Granberg AS is also located in Innbjoa. Granberg is the biggest import company in Norway for Gloves. Bjoa Church is also located in the village. Gråhorga or Gråhorjo is the tallest mountain in the area, at 740m (2,100ft) above sea level. Another smaller mountain is Steinslandsåta, a small hill at 249m (816ft) above sea level. Which was also used as a hillfort.

References 
 "Bjoa, Vindafjord (Rogaland)" (in Norwegian). yr.no. Retrieved 2015-07-19.
 Store norske leksikon. "Bjoa" (in Norwegian). Retrieved 2015-07-19.

References

Villages in Rogaland
Vindafjord